Stephen Curry (born 1988) is an American professional basketball player.

Stephen Curry may also refer to:
Stephen Curry (comedian) (born 1976), Australian comedian and actor
Steve Curry (born 1965), American baseball player

See also
Steve Currie (1947–1981), British bass player
Stephen Corry (born 1951), British indigenous rights activist